David Buddo (23 August 1853 – 8 December 1937) was a New Zealand politician and member of the Liberal Party.

Early life
Buddo was born in Edinburgh, Scotland, in 1853. His father was a surgeon with the Indian civil service. He grew up in a rural environment. He became an engineer in Perth, Scotland and came to New Zealand in c. 1874 or 1877. He married Janet Buddo (née Rollo) in 1886. His wife's cousin, Helen Ann Rollo Buddo, became an orphan in infancy and was brought up by them together with their own children. Helen Buddo married Bryan Todd.

Political career

He was a Member of the House of Representatives, representing the Kaiapoi electorate (with two interruptions, when he was defeated) from: 1893–96, 1899–1919, and 1922–28.

He was a Cabinet minister, serving in the cabinet of Sir Joseph Ward between 1909 and 1912 as Minister of Internal Affairs and Minister of Health.

After retiring from Parliament in 1928, Buddo was appointed to the Legislative Council, and served one seven-year term from 11 June 1930 to 10 June 1937, when his term ended.

He was a member of the Lyttelton Harbour Board from 1897 to 1907.

In 1935, he was awarded the King George V Silver Jubilee Medal.

Death
Buddo collapsed on 8 December 1937 while in the office of the Christchurch Gas, Coal and Coke Company. He died on his way to hospital. He was buried at Waimairi Cemetery. Janet Buddo survived her husband until 1945. Helen Todd survived her husband, who died in 1987.

Notes

References

Buddo's reply is as a member of the Board of Governors of Lincoln University College

|-

|-

|-

|-

1853 births
1937 deaths
Local politicians in New Zealand
Members of the Cabinet of New Zealand
Members of the New Zealand Legislative Council
New Zealand farmers
New Zealand Liberal Party MPs
New Zealand Presbyterians
Politicians from Edinburgh
Scottish emigrants to New Zealand
New Zealand Liberal Party MLCs
Members of the New Zealand House of Representatives
New Zealand MPs for South Island electorates
Unsuccessful candidates in the 1896 New Zealand general election
Unsuccessful candidates in the 1919 New Zealand general election
Burials at Waimairi Cemetery
19th-century New Zealand politicians
Todd family
Chancellors of Lincoln University (New Zealand)
Lyttelton Harbour Board members